Trends and Other Diseases is the first studio album by Mats/Morgan Band.

Track listing

1996 debut albums
Mats/Morgan Band albums